Josep Clotet Ruiz (born 28 April 1977) is a Spanish football coach, last in charge of Italian Serie B club Brescia.

As well as working as assistant at several clubs, he managed Cornellà, Figueres, Espanyol B, Halmstad, Málaga B, Oxford United, Birmingham City and SPAL.

Career

Early years
Born in Barcelona, Catalonia Clotet only appeared for local amateurs CF Igualada as a player. He became a coach while still in his 20s, starting with UE Cornellà then moving to RCD Espanyol's youth teams.

Clotet began the 2006–07 season with another side in his native region, UE Figueres, being fired after only nine matches as they eventually suffered relegation from Segunda División B. He subsequently returned to his previous club, still in charge of the youths.

Clotet returned to senior football in the 2009–10 Segunda División B campaign with Espanyol's reserves. He met the same fate as in his previous experience: he was sacked following the seventh round, and the team were relegated.

Sweden and Norway
Clotet worked in Sweden for two years, starting as assistant to Roland Nilsson at Malmö FF, who won the 2010 Allsvenskan title. He then joined fellow league club Halmstads BK as head coach, finishing 16th and last in the 2011 Allsvenskan.

On 20 September 2011, Clotet joined Viking FK as coach in new manager Åge Hareide's backroom staff for the 2012 Norwegian Premier League season. After Hareide was sacked and Kjell Jonevret was appointed as his replacement, he left to look for a new challenge.

Málaga
On 11 July 2012, Clotet was appointed as manager of Tercera División club Atlético MalagueñoMálaga CF's reserveswhere he helped develop several players who would reach the first team shortly after; their progress was aided by Málaga's unstable economic situation. He left the club after only one season, not being able to attain promotion.

Swansea City
On 19 November 2013, Clotet was appointed academy consultant at Swansea City as part of Michael Laudrup's coaching staff. In May of the following year, he was promoted to assistant manager under Garry Monk.

In November 2015, Clotet was offered the manager's job at Championship club Brentford, but rejected the offer out of loyalty to Monk. He left his post at the Welsh club on 9 December of that year alongside first-team coaches James Beattie and Kristian O'Leary, following the sacking of Monk.

Leeds United
On 13 June 2016, Clotet joined Monk's staff at Leeds United as assistant head coach. On 25 May 2017, after the pair led the team to seventh place in the 2016–17 Championship, Monk resigned. A month later, after the appointment as manager of Thomas Christiansen, who was intending to bring in his own backroom staff, director of football Victor Orta confirmed that Clotet wanted to leave to seek a new challenge.

Oxford United
Clotet was appointed manager of League One club Oxford United on 1 July 2017. He was sacked on 22 January 2018, with a record of 12 wins from 36 matches in charge.

Birmingham City

When Monk took over as manager of Championship club Birmingham City on 4 March 2018, Clotet was appointed as his assistant. He became caretaker head coach in June 2019 after Monk was sacked; ahead of the November meeting between Birmingham and Monk's new club, Sheffield Wednesday, Monk claimed he had made an "error of judgment" in working with Clotet, suggested he was untrustworthy, and refused to shake his hand. After six months, during which Clotet made a start on implementing the board's footballing philosophy as well as demonstrating "coaching expertise, man-management and leadership skills, allied to exemplary professional conduct", and integrated the 16-year-old Jude Bellingham into a regular role in the first team, he was appointed as head coach on a permanent basis. Two months with only one league win at the end of the year was followed by the arrival of striker Scott Hogan, whose return to form sparked a ten-match unbeaten run in early 2020 which left the team 16th in the table when football was suspended due to the COVID-19 pandemic. On 8 June, Clotet confirmed that he would leave the club at the end of the season to "explore other coaching opportunities", but after a series of poor results, he left by mutual consent on 8 July with four matches of the season remaining.

Brescia
On 5 February 2021, Clotet was hired as new head coach of Italian Serie B club Brescia, a club owned by Massimo Cellino, his former chairman at Leeds United. He guided Brescia to qualification to the promotion playoffs, where they were eliminated in the first round by Cittadella. Clotet and Brescia subsequently parted ways by the end of the season.

SPAL
On 2 July 2021, Clotet was officially unveiled as the new head coach of Italian Serie B club SPAL.

He was removed from his managerial duties on 5 January 2022, leaving SPAL three points above the relegation zone.

Second stint at Brescia
On 18 June 2022, Clotet agreed to return to Cellino's Brescia, signing a two-year deal with the Rondinelle. After a good start of the season, Clotet experienced a negative string of results by December, leaving Brescia out of the relegation zone and leading to him being sacked on 21 December 2022. On 16 January 2023, however, Clotet was reinstated as head coach with immediate effect, only to be dismissed once again less than a month later, on 6 February, after he failed to improve the team results.

Media
Clotet worked as a pundit on Sky Sports' La Liga review, and also wrote a column for daily newspaper Marca.

Managerial statistics

References

External links

1977 births
Living people
Sportspeople from Barcelona
Spanish footballers
Spanish football managers
UE Cornellà managers
UE Figueres managers
Halmstads BK managers
Oxford United F.C. managers
Birmingham City F.C. managers
Brescia Calcio managers
English Football League managers
Serie B managers
Viking FK non-playing staff
Swansea City A.F.C. non-playing staff
Leeds United F.C. non-playing staff
Birmingham City F.C. non-playing staff
Spanish expatriate football managers
Expatriate football managers in England
Expatriate football managers in Sweden
Spanish expatriate sportspeople in England
Spanish expatriate sportspeople in Sweden
Spanish expatriate sportspeople in Norway
Spanish expatriate sportspeople in Wales
Association footballers not categorized by position
RCD Espanyol B managers
RCD Espanyol non-playing staff
Spanish expatriate sportspeople in Italy
Expatriate football managers in Italy
S.P.A.L. managers